Athade Oka Sainyam  ( He's an Army)  is a 2004 Telugu-language action comedy film produced by K . Atchi Reddy on SVK Films banner and directed by S. V. Krishna Reddy. Starring Jagapati Babu, Neha and music also composed by S. V. Krishna Reddy.

Plot
The film begins with Sridhar / Chanti landing in Hyderabad, renting a house, and defining his agenda. It owns a mimicry artist, a magician, a software engineer, and seeks to kill two. Accordingly, he picks up Siva Reddy, Ali, and Srinivasa Reddy for his mission. One night, they view the secret movements of Chanti and freak out. The next day, when they are about to step down, Chanti divulges the indeed. He is familiar with magnificent kindred elder brother Raghava Rao, sister-in-law Seetha, and a little sister. Raghava Rao is a Good Samaritan who holds high esteem and honor in society and works as the general manager of Good Luck Co-operative Bank. Chanti falls for Swathi, a singer; in addition, his sister is engaged to Swati's brother, and Chanti acquires a fine job in Germany and proceeds. Likewise, everything comes out right.

Now, a twist in the wind occurs. Prakash Rao the chair of Good Luck Bank, swindles hundreds of crores of depositors for illegal laundering of terrorist activities and ruses to seal down. Raghava Rao catches this and accumulates all the pieces of evidence. Hence, Prakash Rao and his partners slaughter him, create it as suicide, and also pin him bankrupt before the public. As a result, Raghava Rao's reverence collapses, and the family is confronted with ignominy. Being cognizant of it, Chanti returns, pledges to prove his brother as rectitude, and recovers every single rupee of depositors including his expenses. Then, plans to intend his vengeance. Subsequently, these three men are also affected by the duplicity of Prakash Rao for which Chanti selected them. Forthwith, they cluster including Swathi, and start their mission.

At first, he moves a pawn by fetching idiotic brother Bharat from abroad. Utilizing his imbecility, Chanti incriminates the gang and bolts their passports. That being said, Chanti by this name. Prakash Rao figures out that Raghava Rao's brother is behind the design. Immediately, he aims to strike his family, whom Chanti hides prior. As well, attempts to acquire his photograph which Chanti swapped with a petty thief Sunil and knaves behind him. Meanwhile, Jeeva, Prakash Rao's sidekick, front offices an audio company that supersedes Swathi's song with his girlfriend Champa. Chanti sets off the scam; as a part of it, he gains credence from Jeeva and intrudes into Prakash Rao's house. Thereat, Chanti switches on along with his mates and step by step starts recovering the amount. Prakash Rao's PA knows this, so they make him temporarily dumb and disabled. Presently, Prakash Rao is conducting a huge deal of stock with terrorists. At the time, Chanti judiciously cracks out Prakash Rao's Swiss Bank account and retrieves the amount. By that time, the PA recovers and discloses the drama. After the final combat, Chanti makes Prakash Rao confess his sin before the public and arouses his brother's glory. At last, he detonates Prakash Rao and Jeeva accompanying their deadly weapons. Finally, the movie ends with the proclamation that "Eating Public Money is Hazardous to Life".

Cast

Jagapati Babu as Chanti / Sridhar / Rupay Paavla
Neha as Swathi
Prakash Raj as Prakash Rao
Suman as Raghava Rao
Brahmanandam as Prakash's P.A.
Ali as magician Ali
Sunil as Sunil, the thief
M. S. Narayana as Swathi's father
Srinivasa Reddy as Srinivasa Reddy, software engineer
Jeeva as Jeeva
Seetha as Seeta, Raghava's wife
Harsha Vardhan as Prakash's goon
Siva Reddy as Siva Reddy, mimicry artist
Gautam Raju as Vegetable Seller
Allari Subhashini as Jeeva's wife
Sameer as Ramakrishnan 
Jenny
Uttej
Bandla Ganesh
Siva Krishna as ACP
Bharat as Bharat
Shraddha Nigam as Champa
Sirisha
Shobha Rani
Anitha
Master Kaushik
Master Tanush

Soundtrack

Music was composed by S. V. Krishna Reddy and released by SOHAN Music Company. Lyrics were written by Chandra Bose.

Awards
Sunitha won Nandi Award for Best Female Playback Singer for the song "Naa Paata"

References

2004 films
Indian action comedy films
Indian films about revenge
2000s Telugu-language films
Films directed by S. V. Krishna Reddy
Films scored by S. V. Krishna Reddy
Indian heist films
2000s heist films
2004 action comedy films